Jorge Guzmán Florentino (born January 28, 1996) is a Dominican professional baseball pitcher in the San Francisco Giants organization. He has played in Major League Baseball (MLB) for the Miami Marlins. He made his MLB debut in 2020.

Career

Houston Astros
Guzmán signed with the Houston Astros as an international free agent in June 2014. He made his professional debut in 2015 with the Dominican Summer League Astros and also played for the Gulf Coast Astros that season, posting a combined 5.04 ERA in 55.1 innings pitched between both teams. In 2016, he played for the Gulf Coast Astros and Greeneville Astros and pitched to a combined 3-4 record and 4.05 ERA with 54 strikeouts in 40 innings pitched between both clubs.

New York Yankees
On November 17, 2016, Guzmán was traded from the Astros, along with Albert Abreu, to the New York Yankees for Brian McCann. He spent the 2017 season with the Staten Island Yankees where he posted a 5-3 record and 2.30 ERA in 13 games started.

Miami Marlins
On December 11, 2017, Guzmán was traded to the Miami Marlins (along with Starlin Castro and José Devers) in exchange for outfielder Giancarlo Stanton and cash considerations. He spent the 2018 season with the Jupiter Hammerheads, going 0-9 with a 4.03 ERA in 21 starts.

 He spent 2019 with the Jacksonville Jumbo Shrimp, going 7-11 with a 3.50 ERA over 25 games (24 starts), striking out 127 over  innings. The Marlins added Guzmán to their 40-man roster after the season.

On August 3, 2020, Guzmán was promoted to the Major Leagues. Guzmán made his MLB debut on August 6, against the Baltimore Orioles, and allowed 2 runs in an inning of work.

On May 9, 2021, Guzmán was placed on the 60-day injured list with elbow inflammation. He was activated off of the injured list on July 13. On September 3, Guzmán was placed back on the 60-day injured list with right elbow soreness. Guzmán became a free agent following the 2021 season.

San Francisco Giants
On January 31, 2022, Guzmán signed a minor league contract with the San Francisco Giants.

References

External links

1996 births
Living people
Dominican Republic expatriate baseball players in the United States
Dominican Summer League Astros players
Gigantes del Cibao players
Greeneville Astros players
Gulf Coast Astros players
Jacksonville Jumbo Shrimp players
Jupiter Hammerheads players
Major League Baseball pitchers
Major League Baseball players from the Dominican Republic
Miami Marlins players
People from Monte Cristi Province
Staten Island Yankees players